111 Huntington Avenue is a Boston skyscraper. Located on Huntington Avenue, it is part of the Prudential Center complex that also houses the Prudential Tower. It is Boston's tenth-tallest building. It won the 2002 bronze Emporis Skyscraper Award. It is sometimes given the unofficial nickname The R2-D2 Building after the Star Wars droid's top.

Design

 
The 36-story tower is capped by an open-frame dome and crown which is illuminated at night. The building's original design called for a flat roof, but Boston Mayor Thomas Menino objected; Menino chose the present design from among several options the developer subsequently proposed.

The postmodern facade consists of a blue glass curtain wall designed by the architect firm Childs Bertman Tseckares Inc. (CBT). The lobby interior consists of reflective black marble walls with finished wood paneling and a dramatic lobby waterfall. It can be accessed from the adjacent Prudential retail mall.

The building includes a number of energy-efficiency features.

The project was constructed by John Moriarty & Associates, Inc.

Tenants

Other notable tenants include Foley & Lardner LLP, Analysis Group, Edwards Wildman Palmer, Bain Capital, Citi Private Bank and Apple Inc.

See also
Shops at Prudential Center
List of tallest buildings in Boston

References

Further reading
Hunt for space: 111 Huntington bursting at the seams (March 3, 2006) – BizJournals.com(Boston)

External links

 Prudential Center Properties (including 111 Huntington Ave) 
 Emporis.com
 CBT (Childs Bertman Tseckares, Inc.)
 John Moriarty & Associates (JMA)

Skyscraper office buildings in Boston
Office buildings completed in 2002
2002 establishments in Massachusetts